Sanniki may refer to the following places:
Sanniki, Masovian Voivodeship (east-central Poland)
Sanniki, Białystok County in Podlaskie Voivodeship (north-east Poland)
Sanniki, Sokółka County in Podlaskie Voivodeship (north-east Poland)
Sanniki, Greater Poland Voivodeship (west-central Poland)